Jane Frances Kaczmarek (born December 21, 1955) is an American actress. She is best known for her role as Malcolm's mother Lois on the Fox television sitcom Malcolm in the Middle (2000–2006), which earned her three Golden Globe nominations and seven Primetime Emmy nominations. She also appeared as Linda in Equal Justice (1990–1991), Judge Trudy in Raising the Bar (2008–2009), Ann in Falling in Love (1984), Emily in The Heavenly Kid (1985), and Gayle in 6 Balloons (2018). She had recurring roles as Holly in Cybill and as Maureen Cutler in Frasier and is also known for a large number of recurring and guest-starring roles in various television shows.

Early life 
Kaczmarek was born in Milwaukee, Wisconsin, the daughter of Evelyn (née Gregorska), a teacher, and Edward Kaczmarek, a US Department of Defense worker. She grew up in Greendale, where she was raised a Roman Catholic.

Career

Early career 

She appeared on many television shows in recurring and guest-starring roles, including St. Elsewhere, sitcoms like Frasier and Cybill, and many more.

Malcolm in the Middle
In 1999, Kaczmarek was cast to play Lois in the sitcom Malcolm in the Middle, which premiered on January 9, 2000. TV Guide dubbed her role in the series as a "true breakout; a female Homer Simpson", and critics hailed her for her comic talents. Later, Kaczmarek would credit the show for bringing out her comedic side, saying, "[Before Malcolm] I couldn't even get auditions for comedies. I played very unfunny people."

Later work 

On July 22, 2011, it was confirmed that Kaczmarek would make a vocal appearance as Red Jessica in the television series Jake and the Never Land Pirates during its second season early 2012.

In November 2012, she made a guest appearance on ABC's The Middle as Frankie Heck's (Patricia Heaton) dental teacher. In 2013, Kaczmarek guest starred on NBC's long-running legal drama, Law & Order: Special Victims Unit, as Suffolk County D.A. Pamela "Pam" James.

Kaczmarek and former Malcolm in the Middle co-star Bryan Cranston reprised their roles as Lois and Hal respectively in an "alternate ending" featurette on the Breaking Bad DVD/Blu-ray box set that was released on November 26, 2013. In it, Hal wakes up from the nightmare that was the plot of Breaking Bad, in a nod to the final scene from Newhart.

Personal life
Kaczmarek married fellow Wisconsin native and actor Bradley Whitford on August 15, 1992. They lived in Los Angeles with their three children. Both were active with charity, and were seen attending major award shows together. In June 2009, the couple filed for divorce after almost 17 years of marriage. The divorce was finalized in October 2010. One of the last times they were seen together publicly was in September 2008, at the opening of a Los Angeles production of The House of Blue Leaves, in which Kaczmarek was starring. According to a June 2009 magazine interview with More.com conducted prior to announcement of the divorce, she replied "That's a big no comment" when asked to sum up her love life. She added that she used to believe that she could "go it alone and as long as I had some fabulous boy on my arm, or man, and my career was sailing, that's all I needed" whereas she now had grown to appreciate the support of her girlfriends "to talk about kids, to talk about marriages, to talk about just life". In 2010, they sold their 1924 villa in San Marino, California.

Kaczmarek underwent a hip replacement in April 2004, due to chronic arthritis. She recovered quickly, and used an X-ray of her new hip for her Emmy campaign the following summer, advertising herself as "the only Emmy nominee with an artificial hip (except for Anthony LaPaglia)".

Filmography

Film

Television

Awards and nominations

References

External links 

 
 Kaczmarek supports Milwaukee parks

1955 births
20th-century American actresses
21st-century American actresses
Actresses from Milwaukee
American film actresses
American people of Polish descent
American Roman Catholics
American television actresses
Living people
University of Wisconsin–Madison alumni
Yale School of Drama alumni
People from San Marino, California
People from Greendale, Wisconsin
Catholics from California
Catholics from Wisconsin
Wisconsin Democrats
California Democrats